Tamarack Microelectronics was a designer and manufacturer of mixed-signal integrated circuits, primarily Ethernet communications devices.  It was founded in 1987 in Hsichih, Taipei.  In August 2002 it merged with IC Plus.

Products

Patents

References

1987 establishments in Taiwan
2002 disestablishments in Taiwan
Companies based in Taipei
Companies established in 1987
Fabless semiconductor companies
Semiconductor companies of Taiwan